Hugo Orellana Bonilla (Jauja 1932 - January 28, 2007) was one of the most recognized Peruvian painters. 
He was born in 1932 Ataura a district of Jauja, Peru.
He has studied at the Lima Academy of Fine Arts, Paris, Florence and Mexico City between 1953 and 1961.

Major influences
In 1987 his critically acclaimed retrospective was presented at the Alianza Francesa in Lima, Peru.
A mentor to many young artists from Latin America, he took a special interest in studying Andean philosophy and traditions. His collection of ethnomusicology is housed at the Pontifical Catholic University of Peru.

A prolific artist he continued to explore new styles in Huayta Huasi his museum-house in the remote town of Ataura in Jauja. He was part of a new generation of artists who also shared with painters, musicians and eminent researchers. While in Europe he befriended Mario Vargas Llosa, Guillermo Lobatón and Julio Ramón Ribeyro among others.

Orellana Bonilla found a group of Arts and Letters along with poets from Jauja Martín Fierro, Dimas Fernández, Gerardo García Rosales and Sergio Castillo Falconí.

He has served as consultant to academics and university students. His writings were published in different languages and were presented in much of the world. He left a great legacy of unpublished paintings and writings, voice and video recordings and sculptures to his successors.

In France he was the leading voice of Andean group, los Calachakis.

Honors
 He received Doctor Honoris Causa from Los Andes Peruvian University.

Footnotes

External links 
A tribute to the artist and master, A site dedicated by UPLA

Publications
Hugo Orellana un arte de luz y alegría, Official newspaper of Perú, El Peruano.
Hugo Orellana's Website, Written by Yina Hurtado Bonilla

Videos
, video when He interprets a beautiful song in Quechua and Spanish.

1932 births
2007 deaths
20th-century Peruvian painters
20th-century Peruvian male artists
Peruvian male painters